Galesburg Santa Fe Station was a railway station in the west central Illinois town of Galesburg. The station was along the Atchison, Topeka and Santa Fe Railway's main line and served trains such as the Super Chief and El Captain. After Amtrak took over intercity rail in the United States, it was served by trains such as the Lone Star (1971–1979) and the Southwest Chief (1971–1996).

Although train service ended in 1996 and it has been demolished since, the site is still used if derailments cause trains to use the Chillicothe Subdivision instead of the Mendota Subdivision.

History

Background
The first railroad to arrive in Galesburg was the Chicago, Burlington and Quincy Railroad in December 1854. The railroad served passengers at a large depot at South and Seminary streets. Galesburg was also a major junction for the CB&Q, since it was the point where many branch lines crossed the Chicago—Denver main line. Also in Galesburg was the railroad's roundhouse and hump yard, the latter still used with BNSF.

Atchison, Topeka and Santa Fe
The Santa Fe Railway was originally planned to bypass Galesburg 10 to 12 miles to the southeast. The railway was trying to build on the straightest line possible between Kansas City and Chicago—Galesburg was not on this line. Led by Clark E. Carr, the townspeople tried to persuade the railway to build through Galesburg. A guaranty—signed by many citizens of Galesburg—was telegraphed to the Santa Fe's headquarters in Boston. It offered 20 acres of land for a depot, as well as the right-of-way through town. To save money, the railroad used the right of way closely following the Cedar Fork Valley.

Station houses
First built in 1888, the station was made out of red sandstone. The two-story building had a slate roof and an octagonal tower facing the tracks. A unique feature of the station was that it had two different waiting rooms, one for men and one for women.

In 1964, the building was demolished and replaced in by a smaller, one-story building. The razing and construction of the new depot received mixed reactions by the residents of the town—many of them thought that the depot could be restored. The railway asked the city of Galesburg to remove the grade crossing with Cedar Street, directly west of the depot. In return, the Santa Fe would build the new station, and use the space where the old depot stood for parking.

It was not the only Amtrak station in Galesburg – the other station, located on South Seminary Street, served the Illinois Zephyr and the California Zephyr.

Closure
In 1995, the Santa Fe and Burlington Northern railways merged to form the Burlington Northern Santa Fe Railway. To allow trains to switch freely between lines, a connector outside Cameron, Illinois (southwest of Galesburg) was built.  This connector (known as the Cameron Connector) allows the Southwest Chief to switch to the ex-CB&Q, ex-BN track, where other Amtrak trains already operated. This combined with the amendment of track vital getting to Chicago Union Station, causing Amtrak to move all operations in Galesburg to the present station. This move also made stations in Chillicothe and Streator, Illinois lose service.

Gallery

Notes

References

Railway stations in the United States opened in 1888
Railway stations closed in 1996
Galesburg, Illinois
Atchison, Topeka and Santa Fe Railway stations
Former Amtrak stations in Illinois
1888 establishments in Illinois
1996 disestablishments in Illinois
Transportation buildings and structures in Knox County, Illinois